Cenisio is a station on Line 5 of the Milan Metro.

History 
The works for the construction of the station began in July 2011, as part of the second section of the line, from Garibaldi FS to San Siro Stadio. It was opened to the public on 20 June 2015, nearly two months after the opening of this section of the line, and five months earlier than scheduled.

Station structure 
Cenisio is an underground station with two tracks served by one island platform and, like all the other stations on Line 5, is wheelchair accessible.

Interchanges 
Near this station are located:
  Tram stops (lines 12 and 14)

References

Line 5 (Milan Metro) stations
Railway stations opened in 2015
2015 establishments in Italy
Railway stations in Italy opened in the 21st century